This is a list of music festivals in Indonesia.

Festivals

Active
Bestival Bali
Djakarta Warehouse Project
Hammersonic Festival
Jakarta International Java Jazz Festival
LaLaLa Festival
North Sumatra Jazz Festival
Rock In Solo
Sunny Side Up Tropical Festival
Synchronize Festival
Ultra Bali
We The Fest

Defunct
Java Rockin'land
Java Soulnation
Java Soundsfair

Indonesia
Indonesia
Music festivals in Indonesia